John William Melvin (May 15, 1938 – July 17, 2014) was a research engineer in the field of the biomechanics of automobile crashes and a safety consultant in the field of automotive racing safety.

Early life and education
Melvin was born in Washington D.C. to Eleanor (Joness) Melvin and Eugene H. Melvin. He received his B.S. (1960), M.S. (1962) and Ph.D. (1964) degrees in Theoretical and Applied Mechanics from the University of Illinois.

Career
Melvin worked as a research scientist at the University of Michigan Transportation Research Institute (UMTRI) from 1968 to 1985.  He was an Associate Professor in the Mechanical Engineering and Applied Mechanics Department at the University of Michigan from 1978 to 1986.

From 1985 to 1998 Melvin was a Senior Staff Research Engineer at the General Motors Research Laboratories.  He retired from General Motors in 1998 and became an independent consultant for the automotive industry and for organizations such as the Indy Racing League, the FIA / Formula 1, and NASA. In 2001, he became a safety consultant for NASCAR, serving as the Technical Consultant to NASCAR for Race Car Safety.

John Melvin held four patents in the field of automotive safety:
, "Data link arrangement with error checking and retransmission control".
, "Multi-chamber air bag with displacement responsive valve".
, "Four point seat-mounted restraint apparatus".
, "Four point restraint apparatus".

References

1938 births
2014 deaths
University of Michigan staff
University of Michigan faculty